Yangwon Station is a station on the Gyeongui-Jungang Line. Geographically, it is the easternmost train/metro station in Seoul north of the Han River.

External links
 Station information from Korail

Seoul Metropolitan Subway stations
Railway stations opened in 2005
Metro stations in Jungnang District